This is a list of Bangladeshi Twenty20 International cricketers. A Twenty20 International is an international cricket match between two representative teams, as determined by the International Cricket Council (ICC). A Twenty20 International is played under the rules of Twenty20 cricket. This list comprises all members of the Bangladesh cricket team who have played at least one T20I match. It is initially arranged in the order in which each player won his first Twenty20 cap. Where more than one player won his first Twenty20 cap in the same match, those players are listed alphabetically by surname.

Key

Players
Statistics are correct as of 14 March 2023.

Notes

See also
 Twenty20 International
 Bangladesh national cricket team
 List of Bangladesh Test cricketers
 List of Bangladesh ODI cricketers

References

External links
 Bangladesh Cricket Team

Twenty20
Bangladesh